The Couches de l’Aroley (short: Aroley Formation) are a sedimentary formation deposited during the Early Cretaceous (Barremian to Aptian). They consist of calcitic schists with dolomite clasts interbedded with finegrained conglomerates. The whole sequence is about 100 m thick.

The Couches de l’Aroley are the lowest of the three post-rift sequences deposited in the Valais ocean. It overlies syn-rift sequences of the Brèches du Grand Fond Group.

The Aroley Formation can be found within the following nappes:
External Valais
Moûtiers unit
Roc de l'Enfer unit
Petit St. Bernard unit
Internal Valais
Versoyen unit

The type locality is the Massif de la Pierre Avoi, in Saxon, Valais, Switzerland. The formation is named after a "Plan Aroley" which lies below the Pierre Avoi. It was first described by Rudolf Trümpy 1952.

The Couches de l’Aroley can be correlated with the Klus Formation and the Tristel Formation found in eastern Switzerland, the Engadin window and the Tauern window.

References

Geologic formations of France
Geologic formations of Switzerland
Lower Cretaceous Series of Europe
Cretaceous France
Cretaceous Switzerland
Barremian Stage
Geology of the Alps